The Shahid Pour Sharifi Arena is an indoor sports arena in Tabriz, Iran. It is the home stadium of Futsal Super League team Mes Sungun FSC. The stadium holds up to 6,000 people.

It hosted the Asian Men's Junior Handball Championship from 2 – 14 August 2014.

References

Indoor arenas in Iran
Sports venues in Tabriz
Sports venues completed in 2009